The Financial Accounting Foundation (FAF) is located in Norwalk, Connecticut, United States.  It was organized in 1972 as a non-stock, Delaware Corporation.  It is an independent organization in the private sector, operating with the goal of ensuring objectivity and integrity in financial reporting standards.

The foundation is responsible for:

 Establishing and improving financial accounting and reporting standards;
 Educating constituents about those standards;
 The oversight, administration, and finances of its standard-setting Boards, the Financial Accounting Standards Board (FASB) and the Governmental Accounting Standards Board (GASB), and their Advisory Councils;
 Selecting the members of the standard-setting Boards and Advisory Councils; and
 Protecting the independence and integrity of the standard-setting process.

FAF operates four branches in its organization:
 FASB
 GASB
 The Financial Accounting Standards Advisory Council (FASAC). This branch is composed of FASB constituents and consults with FASB on issues.
 The Governmental Accounting Standards Advisory Council (GASAC). This branch is composed of GASB constituents and consults with GASB on issues.

The FAF Board of Trustees is made up of members from constituent organizations having interest in financial reporting.  These constituent organizations include:

American Accounting Association
American Institute of Certified Public Accountants
CFA Institute
Financial Executives International
Government Finance Officers Association
Institute of Management Accountants
National Association of State Auditors, Comptrollers and Treasurers
Securities Industry and Financial Markets Association

There are currently five officers and fourteen trustees. The FAF operates seven committees:
 the Executive Committee
 the Development Committee
 the Appointments and Evaluations Committee
 the Finance and Compensation Committee
 the Audit Committee
 the Standard-Setting Process Oversight Advisory Committee
 the Corporate Governance Committee

In February 2020, FAF appointed former acting president John Auchincloss as the foundation's executive director.

References

External links

Accounting in the United States
Self-regulatory organizations in the United States
Companies based in Norwalk, Connecticut
1972 establishments in Connecticut